The Vigrafjorden is a fjord located in the municipalities of Giske and Ålesund in Sunnmøre. It is located east of the island of Vigra, after which it is named, in Giske and southwest of Lepsøya in Ålesund. At its deepest, the fjord is 181 meters.

Ålesund Airport, Vigra is located on the west side of the fjord, on the island of Vigra. The village of Roald is located a little north of the airport.

See also
 List of Norwegian fjords

References

Fjords of Møre og Romsdal
Giske
Sunnmøre